Castle Theatre Wellingborough is located in the town of Wellingborough, Northamptonshire, England. The Castle was opened in 1995 as a community resource organisation on the site of Wellingborough's Old Cattle Market. 

Facilities include: 
 Main House Theatre with 503 seats. Can have variable seating formats 
 Main House can be 'flat-floored' for standing concerts with a capacity of up to 700. It can also be in Cabaret format for approx 150 
 84-seat Studio Theatre. 120 in Cabaret format   
 Dance studio   
 Rehearsal Room used for workshops and meetings 
 Art gallery  
 Separate exhibition wall 
The bar and restaurant facilities are currently operated by Castle Theatre/Parkwood Leisure

Spaces are also available for business meetings and functions, wedding receptions, lectures, conferences, Christmas parties, dinners, talks, workshops, classes, and seminars, 

Programming is a balanced mix of professional work, hires, community theatre, film, live satellite streaming from the National Theatre, Royal Opera House and Royal Shakespeare Company, as well as a professional Christmas show.

In June 2016 Castle Theatre Wellingborough was closed, but was re-opened in August 2016. It is currently operated by Parkwood Leisure.

Artistic Directors
Former Artistic Directors.

1994-1998    Dominic Barber
1999-2001    Daniel Austin (now the Director, joint Executive and Artistic, at Jersey Arts Centre)
2001-2004    David Bown (Chief Executive of Harrogate Theatre)
2004-2007    Bart Lee
2007-2008    Karl Wallace (now Chief Executive and Creative Director National Folk Theatre of Ireland)
2009–2011   Nik Ashton 

The role of Artistic Director has now ended at the Castle Theatre after Nik Ashton left the theatre in 2011.

External links 
 https://www.parkwoodtheatres.co.uk/castle-theatre
 www.facebook.com/castletheatrewellingborough
 https://twitter.com/castle_WEL
 https://www.instagram.com/castletheatrewel/
 Borough Council of Wellingborough

Theatres in Northamptonshire
Wellingborough